Hobart is the capital of Tasmania, Australia.

Hobart may also refer to:

Places

Australia
Electoral division of Hobart, Tasmania, Australia
Electoral district of Hobart, Tasmania, a former electoral district
Hobart Rivulet, Tasmania
Roman Catholic Archdiocese of Hobart, Tasmania

United States
Hobart, Indiana, a city
Hobart station (Indiana), a train station
Hobart Township, Lake County, Indiana
Hobart, Louisiana, an unincorporated community 
Hobart, Michigan, an unincorporated community
Hobart Township, Otter Tail County, Minnesota
Hobart, Missouri, a ghost town
Hobart, New York, a village
Hobart station (New York), part of the New York Central Railroad
Hobart Township, Barnes County, North Dakota
Hobart, Oklahoma, a city
Hobart, Washington,  a census-designated place
Hobart, Wisconsin, a village

People
Hobart (surname)
Hobart (given name)

Titles
 Baron Hobart, a subsidiary title held by the Earl of Buckinghamshire
 Hobart Baronets

Ships
Hobart-class destroyer, a ship class of the Royal Australian Navy
HMAS Hobart, three ships of the Royal Australian Navy
HMS Hobart (1794), a Royal Navy sloop

Other uses
Hobart (magazine) (also called Hobart Pulp), a literary journal
Hobart Corporation, a manufacturer of commercial kitchen equipment
4225 Hobart, an asteroid

See also

Hubert